South Central Conference may refer to:

 South Central Conference (Illinois)
 South Central Conference (Indiana)
 South Central Conference (Iowa)
 South Central Athletic Conference

See also
 
 South Conference (disambiguation)
 Conference
 South Central (disambiguation)
 Central (disambiguation)
 Centre (disambiguation)
 Center (disambiguation)
 South (disambiguation)